France sent a team of 323 athletes to the 2008 Summer Olympics.

Medalists

Archery

France will send archers to the Olympics for the twelfth time. France qualified a full team of three women by placing eighth in the women's team event at the 2007 World Outdoor Target Championships. The nation had no men qualify at the world tournament, but Romain Girouelle earned the nation one spot in the men's individual competition at the European qualifying tournament.

Men

Women

Athletics

The French athletics team, composed of 52 athletes, including 18 relay competitors, for 2008 Summer Olympics was announced on the July 28, 2008, following the French National Championships held in Albi. Frank Chevallier, the national technical director, believes that France has a better chance of winning two to four athletic medals.

Men
Track & road events

Field events

Combined events – Decathlon

Women
Track & road events

Field events

Combined events – Heptathlon

* The athlete who finished in second place, Lyudmila Blonska of the Ukraine, tested positive for a banned substance. Both the A and the B tests were positive, therefore Blonska was stripped of her silver medal, and both French heptathletes moved up a position.

Badminton

France is being represented by two athletes.

Boxing

France qualified nine boxers for the Olympic boxing tournament. Oubaali, Vastine, and M'Bumba qualified at the 2007 World Championships. Djelkhir became the fourth French qualifier at the first European qualifying tournament. Thomas, Hallab, Sow, and Chiguer joined the French Olympic team by qualifying at the 2nd continental qualifier.

Canoeing

Slalom

Sprint
Men

Women

Qualification Legend: QS = Qualify to semi-final; QF = Qualify directly to final

Cycling

Road
Men

Women

Track
Sprint

Pursuit

Keirin

Omnium

Mountain biking

BMX

Diving

Women

Equestrian

Dressage

Eventing

* Nicolas Touzaint, a 2004 team gold medallist, had to withdraw just before the start of the competition because of an injury to his horse. His score was automatically set to 1000.00 for team purposes. When Jean Renaud Adde was later eliminated from the competition for falling off his horse on the cross-country course, the same happened to him, causing an astronomical team score for the cross-country ride.

Fencing

Men

Women

Gymnastics

Artistic
Men
Team

Individual finals

Marks and ranks from vault qualification differ as two vaults are used to determine event finalists while only the first of those counts toward the all-around total. Thomas Bouhail qualified for the all-around final of the top 24 gymnasts because the number of finalists from the same nation is limited to two. Thus, three gymnasts ranked ahead of him were ineligible.

Women
Team

Individual finals

Trampoline

Handball

Men's tournament

Roster

Group play

Quarterfinal

Semifinal

Gold medal game

Final rank

Women's tournament

Roster

Group play

Quarterfinal

Classification semifinal

5th–6th place

Judo

Men

Women

Modern pentathlon

Rowing

Men

Women

Qualification Legend: FA=Final A (medal); FB=Final B (non-medal); FC=Final C (non-medal); FD=Final D (non-medal); FE=Final E (non-medal); FF=Final F (non-medal); SA/B=Semifinals A/B; SC/D=Semifinals C/D; SE/F=Semifinals E/F; QF=Quarterfinals; R=Repechage

Sailing 

Men

Women

Open

M = Medal race; EL = Eliminated – did not advance into the medal race; CAN = Race cancelled

Shooting

Men

Women

Swimming

France sent a total of 35 swimmers to these Games, including Alain Bernard and Laure Manaudou.

Men

* Competed in the heats only

Women

* Competed in the heats only

Synchronized swimming

France will have two entrants in synchronized swimming, competing in the duet event.

Table tennis

Taekwondo

Tennis

Men

Women

Triathlon

Weightlifting

Wrestling 

Men's freestyle

Men's Greco-Roman

 Ara Abrahamian of Sweden, who beat Melonin Noumonvi for bronze in the 84 kg class, was stripped of his medal for violating the spirit of fair play. However, the medal was not handed to Noumonvi or any other wrestler.
 Yannick Szczepaniak originally finished fifth, but in November 2016, he was promoted to bronze due to disqualification of Khasan Baroev.

Women's freestyle

See also
 France at the 2008 Summer Paralympics

References

Nations at the 2008 Summer Olympics
2008
Summer Olympics